The Bridger Range, also known as the Bridger Mountains, is a subrange of the Rocky Mountains in southwestern Montana in the United States. The range runs mostly in a north–south direction between Bozeman and Maudlow. It is separated from the Gallatin Range to the south by Bozeman Pass; from the Horseshoe Hills to the west by Dry Creek; from the Crazy Mountains to the east by the Shields River valley; and from the Big Belt Mountains to the north by Sixteen Mile Creek. The highest point in the Bridger Range is Sacagawea Peak, which is visible to the northeast from Bozeman.

Although the range is mostly in Gallatin County, a small portion extends into Park County. The entire range is within Gallatin National Forest.

History
The range is named after Jim Bridger, a mountain man of the 19th century who pioneered the Bridger Trail through mountains in southern Wyoming into the Bighorn Basin in 1864.

On January 10, 1938, Northwest Airlines Flight 2 crashed in the Bridger Mountains, killing all 10 aboard.  This was the first fatal crash of a Northwest Airlines aircraft.

Prominent peaks
The most prominent peaks in the Bridgers include:
 Sacagawea Peak, 
 Hardscrabble Peak, 
 Naya Nuki Peak, 
 Saddle Peak, 
 Ross Peak, 
 Mount Baldy, 
 Bridger Peak,

Recreation

Skiing
The Bridger Range is also home to the ski area Bridger Bowl. With the first rope tow installed in 1951, Bridger Bowl quickly became a popular mountain with the locals. The area has a top elevation of 8700 feet and a base elevation of 6100 feet. On average the ski area receives  of snow every year. Backcountry skiing is also very popular in the Bridgers, with snow being available on peaks such as Sacagawea from early November until late May/early June. Beginning in the 2008–2009 ski season, Bridger Bowl started to allow backcountry travel from the ski area via access gates on the northern and southern boundaries.

Hiking
Though many hiking trails exist, Sacagawea Peak is a favorite hiking area in the Bridgers. The hike is a short but strenuous  one-way trek through pine forest, alpine tundra and scree fields to the top of Sacagawea Peak. The Bridger Ridge Run is a  race which takes place in mid-August. The race follows the ridgeline from Fairy Lake to the southern end of the range.

See also
 List of mountain ranges in Montana

Notes

External links

 Bridger Bowl Ski Area
 Bridger Ridge Run
 Information about geological history
 Bridger Community

Ranges of the Rocky Mountains
Mountain ranges of Montana
Landforms of Gallatin County, Montana
Gallatin National Forest